Mir Nawaz is a Pakistani alpine skier. His bronze medal in Giant Slalom skiing at the 2011 South Asian Winter Games was Pakistan's first ever medal at any South Asian Winter Games.

Career
Nawaz won two medals at the 2011 South Asian Winter Games held in India from 10–16 January 2011. He won a bronze in Giant Slalom with a time of 2 minutes and 21.75 seconds and a silver in Slalom.

In 2013, he qualified for the slalom in the 2014 Winter Olympics held in Sochi, Russia.

In 2017, he was named to Pakistan's Asian Winter Games team.

References

Living people
Pakistani male alpine skiers
South Asian Winter Games silver medalists for Pakistan
South Asian Winter Games bronze medalists for Pakistan
South Asian Winter Games medalists in alpine skiing
Alpine skiers at the 2017 Asian Winter Games
Year of birth missing (living people)